Balado may refer to:

 Balado (food), a spicy Minang dish of Indonesia
 Balado, Kinross, a former military airfield near Kinross, in central Scotland
 Roberto Balado, Cuban heavyweight boxer